John E. Weidenboerner House is a historic home located at St. Mary's in Elk County, Pennsylvania.  It was built in 1881 in the Italianate style.  It is located within the St. Marys Historic District.

It was added to the National Register of Historic Places in 1992.

Gallery

References

Houses on the National Register of Historic Places in Pennsylvania
Italianate architecture in Pennsylvania
Houses completed in 1881
Houses in Elk County, Pennsylvania
St. Marys, Pennsylvania
National Register of Historic Places in Elk County, Pennsylvania
1881 establishments in Pennsylvania